The 1988 WTA Aix-en-Provence Open was a women's tennis tournament played on outdoor clay courts in Aix-en-Provence, France and was part of the Category 2 tier of the 1988 WTA Tour. It was the only edition of the tournament ran from 18 July until 24 July 1988. Judith Wiesner won the singles title.

Finals

Singles

 Judith Wiesner defeated  Sylvia Hanika 6–1, 6–2
 It was Wiesner's 1st title of the year and the 2nd of her career.

Doubles

 Nathalie Herreman /  Catherine Tanvier defeated  Sandra Cecchini /  Arantxa Sánchez 6–4, 7–5
 It was Herreman's only title of the year and the 3rd of her career. It was Tanvier's 2nd title of the year and the 6th of her career.

References

External links
 ITF tournament edition details
 Tournament draws

WTA Aix-en-Provence Open
WTA Aix-en-Provence Open
1988 in French tennis